The Meruliaceae are a family of fungi in the order Polyporales. According to a 2008 estimate, the family contains 47 genera and 420 species. , Index Fungorum accepts 645 species in the family.

Taxonomy
The family was formally circumscribed by English mycologist Carleton Rea in 1922, with Merulius as the type genus. He also included the genera Phlebia, Coniophora (now placed in the Coniophoraceae), and Coniophorella (now considered a synonym of Coniophora). His description of the Meruliaceae was as follows: "Hymenium spread over veins, anastomosing pores, or quite smooth; edge of veins or pores fertile." Several genera formerly classified in the Meruliaceae were moved to the family Steccherinaceae  based on molecular evidence.

Description
Meruliaceae species are crust-like or polyporoid, and often have a waxy appearance when dry. Their hyphal systems are monomitic (containing only tightly arranged generative hyphae), and these hyphae have clamp connections. The spores are smooth, thin-walled, and hyaline (translucent). Cystidia are often present in the hymenium. Although rare, some species have a dimitic hyphal system (with both generative and skeletal hyphae). Meruliaceae fungi cause white rot.

Genera

Abortiporus Murrill (1904) – 3 species
Amaurohydnum Jülich (1978) – 1 species
Amauromyces Jülich (1978) – 1 species
Aquascypha D.A.Reid (1965) – 1 species
Aurantiopileus Ginns, D.L.Lindner & T.J.Baroni (2010)
Aurantiporus Murrill (1905) – 5 species
Bjerkandera P.Karst. (1879) – 7 species
Bulbillomyces Jülich (1974) – 1 species
Cerocorticium Henn. (1900) – 7 species
Chrysoderma Boidin & Gilles (1991) – 1 species
Climacodon P.Karst. (1881) – 7 species
Columnodontia Jülich (1979) – 1 species
Conohypha Jülich (1975) – 2 species
Coralloderma D.A.Reid (1965) – 3 species
Crustoderma Parmasto (1968) – 18 species
Crustodontia Hjortstam & Ryvarden (2005) – 1 species
Cyanodontia Hjortstam (1987) – 1 species
Cymatoderma Jungh. (1840) – 1 species
Diacanthodes Singer (1945) – 3 species
Elaphroporia Z.Q.Wu & C.L.Zhao (2018) – 1 species
Gyrophanopsis Jülich (1979) – 2 species
Hydnophlebia Parmasto (1967)– 2 species
Hyphoderma Wallr. (1833) – 104 species
Hyphodontiastra Hjortstam (1999) – 1 species
Hypochnicium J.Erikss. (1958) – 35 species
Lilaceophlebia (Parmasto) Spirin & Zmitr. (2004) – 3 species
Luteoporia F.Wu, Jia J.Chen & S.H.He (2016) – 1 species
Merulius Fr. (1821) – 2 species
Mycoacia Donk (1931) – 17 species
Mycoaciella J.Erikss. & Ryvarden (1978) – 5 species
Mycoleptodonoides Nikol. (1952) – 6 species
Niemelaea Zmitr., Ezhov & Khimich (2015) – 3 species
Odoria V.Papp & Dima (2018) – 1 species
Phlebia Fr. (1821) – 89 species
Phlebiporia Jia J.Chen, B.K.Cui & Y.C.Dai (2014) – 1 species
Pirex Hjortstam & Ryvarden (1985) – 1 species
Podoscypha Pat. (1900) – 39 species
Radulodon Ryvarden (1972) – 11 species
Sarcodontia Schulzer (1866) – 6 species
Scopuloides (Massee) Höhn. & Litsch. (1908) – 5 species
Stegiacantha Maas Geest. (1966) – 1 species
Uncobasidium Hjortstam & Ryvarden (1978) – 2 species

References

 
Meruliaceae
Taxa described in 1922